The Electoral (Amendment) Act 1983 (No. 36) was a law of Ireland which revised Dáil constituencies. It took effect on the dissolution of the 24th Dáil on 21 January 1987 and a general election for the 25th Dáil on the revised constituencies took place on 17 February 1987.

It repealed the Electoral (Amendment) Act 1980, which had defined constituencies since the 1981 general election.

In April 1983, the Minister for the Environment Dick Spring established an independent commission on a non-statutory basis to advise on the revision of constituencies based on the results of the 1981 census. Its members were Brian Walsh, judge of the Supreme Court, chair; Dan Turpin, secretary of the Department of the Environment; and Eamon Rayel, clerk of the Dáil. It was to take into account:

It delivered its report to the government on 29 July 1983. The change was minimal, with two transfers affecting four constituencies in the city of Dublin.

The constituencies were also in operation for the duration of the 26th Dáil elected at the 1989 general election on 15 June 1989.

It was repealed by the Electoral (Amendment) Act 1990, which created a new schedule of constituencies first used at the 1992 general election for the 27th Dáil held on 25 November 1992.

Constituencies

References

Electoral 1983
1983 in Irish law
Acts of the Oireachtas of the 1980s